The Nervia is a  stream of Liguria (Italy).

Geography 
The river rises near Monte Pietravecchia, in the Ligurian Alps, and flows through the Valle Nervia mainly heading south. It passes through the communes of Pigna and Isolabona; around one km before Dolceacqua it receives from right the Barbaira, its most important tributary. After Camporosso and enters the Ligurian Sea between Ventimiglia and Vallecrosia.

Nervia basin (195 km2) is almost totally included in the Province of Imperia, besides 3.5 km2 belonging to France and located in its upper part.

Main tributaries 

 Left hand:
 rio Ubago,
 rio Gordale,
 rio Bonda,
 rio Toca,
 rio Merdanzo (which from Apricale flows down to the Nervia, reaching it near Isolabona),
 rio Peitavino or Vallone degli Orti (flowing in the Nervia at Dolceacqua).
 Right hand:
 rio dei Rugli,
 rio Muratone,
 rio Altomoro,
 rio Marcora,
 rio Papeira,
 torrente Barbaira.

Nature conservation 
The mouth of the Nervia and its surrounding area are included in a SIC (Site of Community Importance) of around 44 ha called Torrente Nervia (code IT1315719); Monte Pietravecchia too, at the sources of the stream, is included in a SIC called 	Monte Toraggio - Monte Pietravecchia (cod. IT1315421).

See also

 List of rivers of Italy

References

External links 

  La foce e il canneto, visit to the mouth of the Nervia; Provincia di Imperia site biodiversita.provincia.imperia.it

Rivers of Italy
Rivers of Liguria
Rivers of the Province of Imperia
Rivers of the Alps
Drainage basins of the Ligurian Sea